William Joseph Hynes (March 31, 1843 – April 2, 1915) was an American newspaperman, lawyer, and politician who served one term as a U.S. Representative from Arkansas from 1873 to 1875.

Biography 
He was born in Kilkee, County Clare, Ireland on March 31, 1843.  His family immigrated to the United States in 1854, following the death of his father, and settled in Springfield, Massachusetts.  Hynes attended the public schools of Springfield and became a printer after completing an apprenticeship at the Springfield Republican newspaper.

His mother died in 1864 and Hynes relocated to Nashville, Tennessee to study law with attorney John O'Neill.  He attended Columbian University's law school (now George Washington University Law School) in Washington, D.C. while working as a newspaper reporter and secretary for Benjamin F. Rice, a United States senator from Arkansas.  He graduated in 1870, and his work for Rice inspired him to move to Arkansas.  He was admitted to the bar and commenced practice in Little Rock.

Congress 
Hynes had been a Democrat, but Rice was a Republican, and Hynes became involved in the Liberal Republican movement of the 1870s.  He was elected as a Liberal Republican to the 43rd Congress (March 4, 1873 – March 3, 1875).  He was the sole non-Republican to vote in favor of the Civil Rights Act of 1875. He was an unsuccessful candidate for reelection in 1874 to the 44th Congress.

Later career 
He moved to Chicago in 1876 and resumed the practice of law.  He returned to the Democratic Party and was active in the Irish Home Rule movement.

He retired from the practice of law in 1910 and moved to Los Angeles, California, where he remained until his death.

Death 
He died on April 2, 1915 and was interred in Calvary Cemetery, vault H.

External links

William J. Hynes at Encyclopedia of Arkansas History and Culture

 House vote on the Civil Rights Act of 1875

1843 births
1915 deaths
People from County Clare
Politicians from Springfield, Massachusetts
Irish emigrants to the United States (before 1923)
Illinois Democrats
Arkansas Liberal Republicans
Liberal Republican Party members of the United States House of Representatives
Members of the United States House of Representatives from Arkansas
Arkansas lawyers
Illinois lawyers
George Washington University Law School alumni
Burials at Calvary Cemetery (Los Angeles)
19th-century American politicians